Karaoke (clipped compound of Japanese kara  "empty" and ōkesutora  "orchestra") is a type of interactive entertainment usually offered in clubs and bars, where people sing along to recorded music using a microphone. The music is an instrumental version of a well-known popular song. Lyrics are typically displayed on a video screen, along with a moving symbol, changing colour, or music video images, to guide the singer. In Chinese-speaking countries and regions such as mainland China, Hong Kong, Taiwan and Singapore, a karaoke box is called a KTV. The global karaoke market has been estimated to be worth nearly $10 billion.

History

1960s: Development of audio-visual-recording devices
From 1961 to 1966, the American TV network NBC carried a karaoke-like series, Sing Along with Mitch, featuring host Mitch Miller and a chorus, which superimposed the lyrics to their songs near the bottom of the TV screen for home audience participation. The primary difference between Karaoke and sing-along songs is the absence of the lead vocalist.

Sing-alongs (present since the beginning of singing) fundamentally changed with the introduction of new technology. In the late 1960s and into the 1970s, stored audible materials began to dominate the music recording industry and revolutionized the portability and ease of use of band and instrumental music by musicians and entertainers as the demand for entertainers increased globally. This may have been attributable to the introduction of music cassette tapes, technology that arose from the need to customize music recordings and the desire for a "handy" format that would allow fast and convenient duplication of music and thereby meet the requirements of the entertainers' lifestyles and the 'footloose' character of the entertainment industry.

1970s: Development of the karaoke machine
The karaoke-styled machine was developed in various places in Japan. Even before the Invention of the first machines, the word “karaoke” had long been used in Japan’s entertainment industry to refer to the use of instrumental recordings as backing tracks in situations when a live band could not be arranged for a singer. Japanese engineer Shigeichi Negishi, who ran a consumer electronics assembly business in Tokyo, made the first prototype in 1967. He subsequently began mass producing coin-operated versions under the brand name "Sparko Box," making it the first commercially available karaoke machine. For media, it used 8-track cassette tapes of commercially available instrumental recordings. Lyrics were provided in a paper booklet. However, he ran into distribution troubles and ceased production of the Sparko Box shortly thereafter. Another early pioneer was Toshiharu Yamashita, who worked as a singing coach, and in 1970 sold an 8-track playback deck with microphone for sing-alongs.

In 1971, nightclub musician Daisuke Inoue independently invented his own karaoke machine in the city of Kobe. His biggest contribution was understanding the difficulty amateurs had in singing pop songs, recording his own versions of popular songs in keys that made them easier for casual singers. As such he also included a rudimentary reverb function to help mask singers' deficiencies. For these reasons, he is often considered to be the inventor of the modern business model for karaoke, even though he was not the first to create a machine and did not, like Negishi or Yamashita, file a patent.  Music has long been part of Japan’s nightlife, and particularly so in the postwar era, when a variety of establishments such as cabarets and hostess clubs emerged to serve the needs of salarymen unwinding and entertaining clients. Music, whether performed for listening or singing along, played a key role. Inoue, a bandleader, drummer, and Electone keyboardist, specialized in leading sing-alongs at nightclubs in Sannomiya, the entertainment district of the city of Kobe. He grew so popular that he became overbooked, and began recording instrumentals for clients when he could not personally perform for them. Realizing the potential for the market, he commissioned a coin-operated machine that metered out several minutes of singing time. Like Negishi’s, it was based on an 8-Track cassette deck, and Inoue called it the “8 Juke.” Inoue loaned the machines to establishments for free in exchange for a portion of the monthly earnings from the machines. He placed the first 8 Jukes in Sannomiya’s “snack bars,” but they initially failed to take off. Inoue then hired hostesses to ostentatiously sing on them, which successfully sparked interest. This also caused a great deal of friction with Inoue’s fellow musicians, who saw it as drawing customers away from them. Nevertheless karaoke spread throughout Kobe, then, over the course of the Seventies, all of Japan as major manufacturers such as JVC began producing their own versions of the singing machine. Karaoke was long performed mainly in bars and hostess clubs in front of other patrons, but in the Eighties, a new style with private rooms emerged, called karaoke boxes. This became the dominant form of karaoke performance in Japan. In 2004, Daisuke Inoue was awarded the tongue-in-cheek Ig Nobel Peace Prize for inventing karaoke, "thereby providing an entirely new way for people to learn to tolerate each other."

The patent holder of the karaoke machine is Roberto del Rosario, who is from the Philippines. He developed the karaoke's sing-along system in 1975 and is recognized as the sole holder of a patent for a karaoke system in the world.

Later developments
Shortly after the development of the LaserDisc, Pioneer started to offer Video Karaoke machines in the 1980s. These are capable of displaying lyrics over a video that accompanies the music.
 In 1992, a scientist named Yuichi Yasutomo created a networked karaoke system for Brother Industries. Called "tsushin karaoke" ("communications karaoke") it served up songs in MIDI format via phone lines to modem-equipped karaoke machines. This new technology swept Japan; by 1998, 94% of karaoke was being sung on networked karaoke machines. As an early form of music on demand, it could be called the first successful audio streaming service. It also allowed for big data analysis of songs popularity in realtime.

Karaoke soon spread to the rest of Asia and other countries all over the world. In-home karaoke machines soon followed but lacked success in the American and Canadian markets. When creators became aware of this problem, karaoke machines were no longer being sold strictly for the purpose of karaoke but as home theater systems to enhance television watching to "movie theater like quality". Home theater systems took off, and karaoke went from being the main purpose of the stereo system to a side feature.

As more music became available for karaoke machines, more people within the industry saw karaoke as a profitable form of lounge and nightclub entertainment. It is not uncommon for some bars to have karaoke performances seven nights a week. commonly with high-end sound equipment superior to the small, stand-alone consumer versions. Dance floors and lighting effects are also becoming common sights in karaoke bars. Lyrics are often displayed on multiple television screens around the bar.

Technology

A basic karaoke machine consists of a music player, microphone inputs, a means of altering the pitch of the played music, and an audio output. Some low-end machines attempt to provide vocal suppression so that one can feed regular songs into the machine and remove the voice of the original singer; however this was, historically, rarely effective. Most common machines are CD+G, Laser Disc, VCD or DVD players with microphone inputs and an audio mixer built in. CD+G players use a special track called subcode to encode the lyrics and pictures displayed on the screen while other formats natively display both audio and video.

Most karaoke machines have technology that electronically changes the pitch of the music so that amateur singers can choose a key that is appropriate for their vocal range, while maintaining the original tempo of the song. (Old systems which used cassettes changed the pitch by altering playback speed, but none are still on the market, and their commercial use is virtually nonexistent.)

A popular game using karaoke is to type in a random number and call up a song, which participants attempt to sing. In some machines, this game is pre-programmed and may be limited to a genre so that they cannot call up an obscure national anthem that none of the participants can sing. This game has come to be called "Kamikaze Karaoke" or "Karaoke Roulette" in some parts of the United States and Canada.

Many low-end entertainment systems have a karaoke mode that attempts to remove the vocal track from regular audio CDs, using an Out Of Phase Stereo (OOPS) technique. This is done by center channel extraction, which exploits the fact that in most stereo recordings the vocals are in the center. This means that the voice, as part of the music, has equal volume on both stereo channels and no phase difference. To get the quasi-karaoke (mono) track, the left channel of the original audio is subtracted from the right channel. The Sega Saturn also has a "mute vocals" feature that is based on the same principle and is also able to adjust the pitch of the song to match the singer's vocal range.

This crude approach results in the often-poor performance of voice removal. Common effects are hearing the reverb effects on the voice track (due to stereo reverb on the vocals not being in the center); also, other instruments (snare/bass drum, bass guitar and solo instruments) that happen to be mixed into the center get removed, degrading this approach to hardly more than a gimmick in those devices. Recent years have seen the development of new techniques based on the fast Fourier transform. Although still not perfect, the results are usually much better than the old technique, because the stereo left-right comparison can be done on individual frequencies.

Early age
Early karaoke machines used 8-track cartridges (The Singing Machine) and cassette tapes, with printed lyric sheets, but technological advances replaced this with CDs, VCDs, laserdiscs and, currently, DVDs. In the late 1980s and 1990s, Pioneer Electronics dominated the international karaoke music video market, producing high quality karaoke music videos (inspired by the music videos such as those on MTV).

In 1992, Taito introduced the X2000, which fetched music via a dial-up telephone network. Its repertoire of music and graphics was limited, but its smaller size and the advantage of continuous updates saw it gradually replace traditional machines. Karaoke machines which are connected via fiber-optic links enabling them to provide instant high-quality music and video are becoming increasingly popular.

Karaoke direct is an Internet division established in 1997 been serving the public online since 1998. They released the first karaoke player that supports MP3+G and now  the KDX2000 model supporting karaoke in DIVX, Format.

One of long-running karaoke device is the DVD, HDD karaoke system, that comes with thousands of songs which popular in business such as karaoke machine rentals and KTV bars, and became popular in asia, especially the Philippines. This device also provides MIDI format with on-screen lyrics on a background video and scoring after you sing, the score will appear from 60 (lowest) to 100 (highest) based on timing and pitch.

Video games

The earliest karaoke-based music video game, called Karaoke Studio, was released for the Nintendo Famicom in 1985, but its limited computing ability made for a short catalog of songs and therefore reduced replay value. As a result, karaoke games were considered little more than collector's items until they saw release in higher-capacity DVD formats.

Karaoke Revolution, created for the PlayStation 2 by Harmonix and released by Konami in North America in 2003, is a console game in which a single player sings along with on-screen guidance and receives a score based on pitch, timing, and rhythm. The game soon spawned several follow-ups including Karaoke Revolution Vol. 2, Karaoke Revolution Vol. 3, Karaoke Revolution Party Edition, CMT Presents Karaoke Revolution: Country and Karaoke Revolution Presents: American Idol. While the original Karaoke Revolution was also eventually released for the Microsoft Xbox console in late 2004, the new online-enabled version included the ability to download additional song packs through the console's exclusive Xbox Live service.

A similar series, SingStar, published by Sony Computer Entertainment Europe, is particularly popular in the European and Australasian markets. Other music video game titles that involve singing by the player include Boogie and its sequel Boogie Superstar, Disney Sing It, Get On Da Mic, the Guitar Hero series starting with World Tour, High School Musical: Sing It!, Lips, the Rock Band series, SingSong, UltraStar, and Xbox Music Mixer.

An Xbox Live App with the same name created by iNiS and powered by The Karaoke Channel/Stingray Karaoke was released on 12 December 2012. The app uses Unreal Engine 3.

VCDs
Many VCD players in Southeast Asia have a built-in karaoke function. On stereo recordings, one speaker will play the music with the vocal track, and the other speaker will play the music without the vocal track. So, to sing karaoke, users play the music-only track through both speakers. In the past, there were only pop-song karaoke VCDs. Nowadays, different types of karaoke VCDs are available. Cantonese opera karaoke VCD is now a big hit among the elderly in China.

On mobile phones
In 2003, several companies started offering a karaoke service on mobile phones, using a Java MIDlet that runs with a text file containing the words and a MIDI file with the music. More usual is to contain the lyrics within the same MIDI file. Often the file extension is then changed from .mid to .kar, both are compatible with the standard for MIDI files.

Researchers have also developed karaoke games for cell phones to boost music database training. In 2006, the Interactive Audio Lab at Northwestern University released a game called Karaoke Callout for the Nokia Series 60 phone. The project has since then expanded into a web-based game and will be released soon as an iPhone application.

Karaoke is now available for the Android, iPhone and other playback devices at many internet storefronts.

On computers and the Internet

Since 2003, much software has been released for hosting karaoke shows and playing karaoke songs on a personal computer. Instead of having to carry around hundreds of CD-Gs or laserdiscs, KJs can "rip" their entire libraries onto their hard drives and play the songs and lyrics from the computer.

Additionally, new software permits singers to sing and listen to one another over the Internet.

Karaoke devices in the 2000s saw a shift towards the use of hard drives to store large collections of karaoke tracks and touch screen devices that allows users to select their songs. This trend was driven by the declining cost of hard drive storage and improvement in touchscreen technology in the consumer space.

In 2010, a new concept of home karaoke system through the use of live streaming from a cloud server emerged. The earliest cloud based streaming device, KaraOK!, was released by StarHub on 14 January 2010, licensing songs from RIMMS. The use of cloud streaming allows for smaller devices with over the air updates compared to costly and bulky hard drive-based systems.

In August 2017, ROXI home music system launched in the UK, and later that year in the US, providing on-demand music streaming and a karaoke singalong feature called Sing with the Stars. ROXI matches songs in its cloud based licensed music streaming catalogue to a lyrics database to provide real time scrolling on-screen lyrics. The music system also uses a hand-held Wii style point and click controller with built-in microphone allowing users to select and sing along to thousands of songs from its catalogue.

In July 2019, YouTube channel Sing King Karaoke reached 6 million subscribers, making it the largest karaoke channel on the platform.

In automobiles

Taxicabs equipped with sound systems and a microphone appeared in South Korea in the 1990s.

Chinese automobile maker Geely Automobile received much press in 2003 for being the first to equip a car, their Beauty Leopard, with a karaoke machine as standard equipment. Europe's first commercial "karaokecab" which was a London TX4 taxi with a karaoke machine inside for occupants of the cab to use to sing whilst in the cab. The idea and installation were made by Richard Harfield of karaokeshop.com and was featured on Channel 4's Big Breakfast and several German TV stations featured the karaokecab. Granada TV also featured the cab, which is now in its 4th vehicle and operates in Bolton, Greater Manchester as Clint's Karaoke Cab. Karaoke is often also found as a feature in aftermarket in-car DVD players.

In 2010, karaoke taxis were available in London, England in the 'Kabeoke' fleet of private hire vehicles.

Tesla's newer cars have an infotainment system that features a "Car-a-oke" app.

Alternative playback devices
The CD+G format of a karaoke disc, which contains the lyrics on a specially encoded subcode track, has heretofore required special—and expensive—equipment to play. Commercial players have come down in price, though, and some unexpected devices (including the Sega Saturn video game console and XBMC Media Center on the first Xbox) can decode the graphics; in fact, karaoke machines, including video and sometimes recording capability, are often popular electronics items for sale in toy stores and electronics stores.

Additionally, there is software for Windows, Pocket PC, Linux, and Macintosh PCs that can decode and display karaoke song tracks, though usually these must be ripped from the CD first, and possibly compressed.

In addition to CD+G and software-based karaoke, microphone-based karaoke players enjoy popularity mainly in North America and some Asian countries such as the Philippines. Microphone-based karaoke players only need to be connected to a TV—and in some cases to a power outlet; in other cases they run on batteries. These devices often support advanced features, such as pitch correction and special sound effects. Some companies offer karaoke content for paid download to extend the song library in microphone-based karaoke systems.

CD+G, DVD, VCD and microphone-based players are most popular for home use. Due to song selection and quality of recordings, CD+G is the most popular format for English and Spanish. It is also important to note that CD+G has limited graphical capabilities, whereas VCD and DVD usually have a moving picture or video background. VCD and DVD are the most common format for Asian singers due to music availability and largely due to the moving picture/video background.

Silent karaoke
Silent karaoke is a noiseless singing exercise microphone.

Terms
Jūhachiban
 (十八番. also ohako). Many karaoke singers have one song which they are especially good at and which they use to show off their singing abilities. In Japan, this is called jūhachiban in reference to Kabuki Jūhachiban, the 18 best kabuki plays. 十八番 means eighteen in Japanese as well.
Karamovie or Movioke
 Karaoke using scenes from movies. Amateur actors replace their favorite movie stars in popular movies. Usually facilitated by software or remote control muting and screen blanking/freezing. Karamovie originated in 2003.
Karaoke jockey or KJ
A karaoke jockey plays and manages the music for a venue. The role of the KJ often includes announcing song titles and whose turn it is to use the microphone.
Hitokara
Singing karaoke alone is called hitokara (ヒトカラ, abbreviation for ひとりカラオケ; ひとり hitori, "one person" or "alone" + カラオケ karaoke) in Japan. Recently this trend has become very popular amongst amateur singers in Japan, India and China, though mostly Japan.

In culture

Public places

Asia
In Asia, a karaoke box is the most popular type of karaoke venue. A karaoke box is a small or medium-sized room containing karaoke equipment rented by the hour or half-hour, providing a more intimate atmosphere. Karaoke venues of this type are often dedicated businesses, some with multiple floors and a variety of amenities including food service, but hotels and business facilities sometimes provide karaoke boxes as well. In South Korea, karaoke boxes are called norebangs. In mainland China and Taiwan, a karaoke establishment is called a KTV.

In some traditional Chinese restaurants, there are so-called "mahjong-karaoke rooms" where the elderly play mahjong while teenagers sing karaoke. The result is fewer complaints about boredom, but more noise. Noise regulations can be an issue, especially when karaoke is brought into residential areas.

Violent reactions to karaoke singing have made headlines in Malaysia, Thailand and the Philippines, with reports of killings by listeners disturbed by the singing. In the Philippines, at least half a dozen killings of people singing "My Way" caused newspapers there to label the phenomenon "My Way killings"; some bars refuse to allow the song, and some singers refrain from vocalizing it among strangers.

Prostitution has been an issue in certain karaoke boxes in Cambodia, Sri Lanka, Thailand and other parts of Southeast Asia despite being illegal in these countries. In Thailand, "karaoke girls" are brought in not only from Thailand but from neighboring countries and are sent to other parts of the world.

Asian karaoke establishments are often fronts for gentlemen's clubs, where men pay for female hosts to drink, sing, and dance with them. In Japan, such a business is called a piano bar.

After the COVID-19 outbreak, karaoke bars in Japan reopened with rules such as mask wearing, mic covers, and singer must face same direction as onlookers.

Taiwan

In Taiwan, karaoke bars similar to those in Japan and South Korea are called KTVs, which stands for karaoke television. Karaoke is a highly popular form of recreation in Taiwan. The biggest KTV chains in Taiwan are Partyworld Cashbox, Holiday KTV and NewCBParty.

South Korea
A noraebang (Hangul: 노래방) refers to a singing venue in South Korea where private sound-proof rooms are available for rent, equipped for singing – typically microphones, remote controls, a large video screen, couches, and mood décor such as disco lights and tambourines. The term noraebang is a Korean compound word, blending norae (Hangul: 노래, English: song) and bang (Hangul: 방, English: room). It is the regional equivalent to the Karaoke box in Japan.

Singing is an important part of social life in Korea, where people will perform, and be persuaded to perform, an impromptu song at virtually any social occasion. As such, noraebangs are popular and widespread, often identifiable by bright neon signs with musical notes or microphones.

Often the last stop after a night of alcohol-lined entertainment for youths and businesspeople alike,<ref>"Doing Business in Korea" Korean New Zealand Business Council </ref> noraebangs are also a favorite family pastime, and many are surprisingly dry venues. People also frequent noraebangs as a form of stress relief, and some noraebangs cater to those who seek to sing alone.

Philippines
Karaoke (Filipino: videoke) has become a pastime activity in the Philippines especially when entertaining friends at home. Instrumental music (also widely called minus-one) on tapes during the late 1960s particularly with the dominance of pop hits from the Beatles had become favorites. Singing contests during town or barangay festivals and fiestas would attract contestants who carry with them cassette tapes with these instrumentals to perform in their own rendition.

Videoke in the Philippines is also known for the My Way killings, a number of fatal disputes which arose due to the singing of the song "My Way", popularized by Frank Sinatra, in karaoke or "videoke" bars. A New York Times article estimated the number of killings to be about six up to 2010. Another source estimated at least 12 between 2002 and 2012. Opinions differ over whether the possible connection is due to the coincidence that the song was simply frequently sung amid the nation's videoke bars where violence is common or to the aggressive lyrics of the song itself.Ichimura, Anri "How Frank Sinatra's Song 'My Way' Triggered Filipino Karaoke Killings", 17 October 2019, Esquire PH. Retrieved 23 February 2023

North America and Europe

A karaoke bar, restaurant, club or lounge is a bar or restaurant that provides karaoke equipment so that people can sing publicly, sometimes on a small stage. Most of these establishments allow patrons to sing for free, with the expectation that sufficient revenue will be made selling food and drink to the singers. Less commonly, the patron wishing to sing must pay a small fee for each song they sing. Both are financially beneficial for the establishment by not having to pay a professional singer or a cabaret tax which is usually applied to any entertainment of more than one person.

Many establishments offer karaoke on a weekly schedule, while some have shows every night. Such establishments commonly invest more in both equipment and song discs, and are often extremely popular, with an hour or more wait between a singer's opportunities to take the stage (called the rotation).

Private karaoke rooms, similar to Asia's karaoke boxes, are commonplace in communities such as Toronto, Los Angeles, Chicago, New York City, Houston, TX, San Francisco and now New Jersey. Toronto's Koreatown is one example of an area where popularity is growing to the point that private karaoke rooms require reservations on the weekends.

Karaoke is very popular in Scotland with dedicated karaoke venues in most reasonably large towns. Aberdeen is home to a number of notable karaoke bars including Weagleys, The Spirit Level, Bardot's Karaoke Bar, Sing City. In North America, the Tri State area is known to have many lounges that participate in weekly karaoke shows. New Jersey has many establishments that are frequented by people of different backgrounds who also participate in karaoke. Hugo's Lounge and Love Lounge located in Plainfield, New Jersey are just a couple of the many establishments with weekly karaoke schedules.

Throughout much of North America, live band karaoke is also popular. With live band karaoke, singers sing with a live band instead of the prerecorded backing track.

Rock critic Rob Sheffield claims that the 1986 music video for the song "Wild Wild Life" by the Talking Heads was the first depiction of karaoke in American popular culture. The video features a variety of characters taking turns singing portions of the song to an audience at a bar. However a karaoke bar in Honolulu called "Sing Sing" is depicted in an episode of the American TV series Magnum, P.I. entitled "The Man from Marseilles" first broadcast on March 14, 1985.

In Italy, karaoke had become popular by early 1994, popularized by television personality Rosario Fiorello who had a karaoke program that appeared weekly on national television.

 Karaoke made a brief appearance in Sofia Coppola's 2003 movie Lost in Translation, and it was, three years before, the primary focus of Bruce Paltrow's 2000 film Duets, written by John Bynum and starring Paltrow's daughter Gwyneth and Huey Lewis, "anchor-man" of Huey Lewis and the News.

Also popular among the international performing arts community in Europe, a group of Finnish producers organized an international karaoke competition called KWC (Karaoke World Championships). Their 2011 international karaoke competition has attracted ABC producers to help host America's karaoke competition in Las Vegas Nevada called Karaoke Battle USA. The competition is promised to select 1 male and 1 female contestant to represent the U.S. in the international arena. Largely supported by the Broadway community in Times Square, Pulse Karaoke Lounge sponsored 2011's New York state karaoke finals to select individuals representing New York in the eastern finals.

According to The New York Times'', the dozens of karaoke bars in Portland, Oregon make it not just "the capital of karaoke" in the United States, but "one of the most exciting music scenes in America."

Australia
In Australia, karaoke was gradually popularized in the late 1980s. A number of Filipino migrants brought with them their own 'minus-one' music from cassette music tapes and video tapes purchased mainly in the Philippines. A number of Philippine-imported karaoke units with two cassette drives were used in private households. Video TV tapes, mainly consisted of popular and contemporary songs rendered by Filipino artists, and with a mix of English and Tagalog songs were soon used. Projected lyrics on TV screens became very common as the main source of karaoke renditions. These tapes were soon replaced by CD+Gs, but a plug-n-play karaoke microphone that housed a factory built-in songchip loaded with hundreds of karaoke songs quickly became a favourite. This unit would usually be purchased in the Philippines and brought into Australia, becoming a common household item and is popularly used during gatherings.

Commercially, karaoke was first introduced into Australia in 1989 by Robin Hemmings who had seen karaoke operating in Fiji. Prior to this, karaoke was generally unknown to the broader population. Hemmings, of Adelaide, South Australia, offered systems manufactured by Pioneer which used 12in (30 cm) double-sided laser discs containing a maximum of 24 songs with accompanying video track and subtitled lyrics.

Despite some initial resistance, Adelaide hoteliers The Booze Brothers offered limited access to their hotels and the karaoke phenomenon was born. Hemmings business, Karaoke Hire Systems, operated seven machines on a casual rental basis to numerous hotels, clubs and private parties in and around Adelaide with an additional machine on snow-season lease at Jindabyne, NSW. Each system came complete with up to 24 discs containing a maximum of 576 music video tracks. In Adelaide, karaoke reached its zenith in 1991 with virtually every hotel offering at least one karaoke night per week with many having undertaken alterations to their premises with the addition of purpose built stages and sound systems. Karaoke rental suppliers had proliferated during this period and Hemmings is known to have sold his business in late 1991 as a going concern.

Karaoke's popularity in Adelaide waned from mid 1992 and was virtually extinguished by early 1993. Despite periodic attempts by hoteliers and clubs to revitalise karaoke, it has never managed to re-establish its former popularity.

In the mid-2000s, a number of karaoke bars sprouted in Sydney with karaoke boxes frequented by Japanese students and tourists and a few locals, especially on Thursday nights and weekends. A number of clubs such as RSL, League Clubs and restaurants and bars mainly feature karaoke nights to entice more customers and to entertain guests. Sunfly Karaoke is probably the major karaoke brand in Australia as well as the UK.

Production methods

Karaoke is very popular in Asian countries, and many artists distribute a karaoke track at the same time the song is released. The most common form of karaoke nowadays is released in MIDI format with on-screen lyrics on a DVD background video.

In Europe and North America, karaoke tracks are almost never done by the original artist, but are re-recorded by other musicians.

South Korean firms T.J. Media, Magic Sing, Kumyoung produce digital music content in MIDI format and manufacture computer music players for the Asian market.

Contests

Since the rise of karaoke around the world, karaoke contests have become a phenomenon of mainstream culture, giving non-professional singers opportunity to showcase their talent, win prizes, and at times, travel the world. Contest participants are usually rated 50% by customer votes and 50% by judges' votes, but this may vary, depending on the venue and the level of competition.

Karaoke World Championship is one of the most popular karaoke contests and has been around since 2003. In September 2011, Karaoke World Championships took place in Killarney, Ireland.

World records
As of 2009, the world record for the most people singing karaoke was at Bristol Motor Speedway in the United States. Over 160,000 people began to sing Garth Brooks' song "Friends in Low Places" before the NASCAR Sharpie 500 race began.

Hungary holds the record for the longest Karaoke marathon with multiple participants for an event organized in the Honey Grill Restaurant by Gabor Dániel Szabó (REVVOX Music). It lasted for 1,011 hours, 1 minute, between 20 July 2011, and 31 August 2011. Each song was over 3 minutes long and the gap between songs was no longer than 30 seconds. No song was repeated in any two-hour period.

The record for the longest Karaoke solo marathon is held by the Italian Leonardo Polverelli, who sang 1,295 songs in 101 hours, 59 minutes, and 15 seconds.

See also

 Closed captioning
 Fansub
 List of English words of Japanese origin
 Music Minus One
 PowerPoint karaoke
 Same language subtitling
 Subtitling
 Surtitles
 Utagoe Kissa

References

External links
 
 

 

 
Japanese entertainment terms
Party games
Singing
Lyrics
1970s establishments in Japan
Japanese inventions
Wasei-eigo
Portmanteaus
Japanese words and phrases